The 1977 Fairfield Bay Tennis Classic, also known as the Arkansas International, was a men's tennis tournament played on indoor hardcourts at Burns Park in North Little Rock, Arkansas in the United States that was part of the 1977 Grand Prix circuit. It was the fourth edition of the event and was held from January 31 through February 6, 1977. Third-seeded Sandy Mayer won the singles title and earned $10,000 first-prize money.

Finals

Singles
 Sandy Mayer defeated  Haroon Rahim 6–2, 6–4
 It was Mayer's 1st singles title of the year and the 5th of his career.

Doubles
 Colin Dibley /  Haroon Rahim defeated  Bob Hewitt /  Frew McMillan 6–7, 6–3, 6–3

References

External links
 ITF tournament edition details

Arkansas International
Arkansas International
Arkansas International